Chris Leach (born 10 February 1942) is a Canadian rower. He competed at the 1960 Summer Olympics and the 1964 Summer Olympics.

Following his Olympic career, Leach and his friend Lach MacLean attended Trent University, where the pair founded the Trent University Rowing Club in 1970. One year later, Leach with the help of Trent University biology professor David Carlisle organized the first Head of the Trent rowing regatta on 23 October 1971.

References

1942 births
Living people
Canadian male rowers
Olympic rowers of Canada
Rowers at the 1960 Summer Olympics
Rowers at the 1964 Summer Olympics
Rowers from St. Catharines
Trent University alumni